Raynes Park High School is a co-educational comprehensive school which educates students aged 11 to 19. It is located in Raynes Park, England, coming under the London Borough of Merton.

Location
Raynes Park High School is situated at the junction of the Kingston bypass (A3) and Bushey Road (A298). To the east, it is bounded by West Barnes Lane (B282), and just east of the boundary between the boroughs of Kingston upon Thames (New Malden) and Merton, and just north of the Shannon Corner junction of the A3/B282.

TfL contracted bus routes that serve the school include 131, 152, 265, 655, K5, N87 with nearby National Rail stations include New Malden, Motspur Park and Raynes Park all operated by South Western Railway and all within the oyster fare zone.

History
The school first came into being as a boys only grammar school in 1935. It remained as such for the next 34 years until 1969 when it became a 13–18 boys' comprehensive. In September 1990, when as along with the rest of the borough's schools, it became a 12–16 mixed comprehensive. Finally in September 2010 like all other high schools in the borough, the school's sixth form was re-instated. The school is now an official mixed 11–19.

Sixth form
Following the conversion of Merton's education system to a two tier structure in the 1990s, the school's sixth form was closed. Students wishing to take A-levels enrolled at various colleges or sixth forms in the area. Subsequently, sixth form centres were re-introduced for all Merton High Schools and in September 2010 the purpose built sixth form block opened its doors to Year 12 students. The sixth form now offers a variety of A-level courses, level 3 vocational courses and also offers GCSE retakes for English and Maths.

Access Centre 
The Access Centre is a provision at Raynes Park High School for students with an ASC (Autism Spectrum Condition) diagnosis and an EHCP. This centre is designed to support autistic students in a mainstream school environment like the one in Raynes Park High School. It runs numerous interventions such as emotional support therapy and Lego therapy. Access Centre students can eat lunch in the Access Centre if they wish to do so instead eating it in the mainstream school environment which can be quite loud for some autistic students.  

Some Access Centre students are supported in lesson by a Key Support Worker (KSW). 

The Access Centre also provides after school clubs for their students such as Rebound Therapy (trampoline therapy) and homework club.  

In 2019 (renewed in 2022), the Access Centre was 'accredited' by the National Autism Society. 

Admission for the Access Centre is decided by the local authority, Merton Council. 

The current capacity of the Access Centre is 25 students.

School organisation
The Head Teacher is Kirsten Heard and the Chair of Governors is Michael Ross. The school last had an Ofsted inspection in January 2019, when it was graded Good.

There have been eight Headteachers:
 John Garrett,
 Charles Wrinch
 T. Henry Porter
 G. David N. Giles
 Brian Butler
 John D. Massey
 Ian Newman
 Phillip Wheatley
 Kirsten Heard

Traditions
W.H. Auden, who had collaborated with the founding headmaster, John Garett, on an anthology called The Poet’s Tongue in 1935, composed the words for the school song, though the original has been since shortened and modernised.

Raynes Park has four Houses: Miltons, Gibbs, Halliwells and Newsoms. The Houses are all identified by distinctive ties (Miltons:white, Gibbs:red, Halliwells:yellow and Newsoms:purple). These names were taken from four of the first five teachers.  The fifth teacher, Cobb, also had a House (Cobbs:green) and the name remained in use for some buildings until December 2002

Awards
 FA Charter Standard Development School Award for outstanding contribution to Football
 Sport England Sports Mark Award for delivery of national PE
 Access Centre Autism Accreditation

Guinness world record
The Guinness world record for the largest egg and spoon race was broken by 859 pupils, from Raynes Park High School, in October 2003.

Notable former pupils

Raynes Park County Grammar School

 Derek Cooper OBE, BBC Radio 4 broadcaster of the Food Programme, and President from 1988 to 1995 of the Guild of Food Writers
 Sir Howard Dalton, Professor of Microbiology from 1983 to 2008 at the University of Warwick, and Chief Scientific Adviser at the Department for Environment, Food and Rural Affairs (DEFRA) from 2002–7
 Charles Higham, archaeologist
 John Hopkins, TV writer
 Maj-Gen Anthony Jeapes CB OBE MC, Commander of Land Forces Northern Ireland from 1985–7, and Commander of 22 Regiment SAS from 1974–7 and 5 Airborne Brigade from 1982–5
 Prof Peter J. Parsons, Regius Professor of Greek at the University of Oxford from 1989 to 2003
 Robert Robinson, TV quiz presenter, and radio presenter of Brain of Britain until 2005
 Prof Tony Tanner, Professor of English and American Literature from 1989 to 1998 at the University of Cambridge
 Sir David Christopher Veness, CBE, QPM, Assistant Commissioner for Specialist Operations, Metropolitan Police 1994–2005, leaving to serve as United Nations Under-Secretary-General for Safety and Security.
 Paul Vaughan, TV and radio broadcaster

Raynes Park High School
 Carl Asaba, professional footballer.
 Leon Britton, professional footballer.
 Simon Coleman (Simon Basher), artist.
 Mike Lindup, pop musician.
 Chris Powell, professional footballer.
 Gary Sheffield, academic military historian.
 Andy Thorn, professional footballer.
 Robbie McIntosh, pop musician.

References

External links
 Official site
 Information on the school on gov.uk  
 Ofsted report

Secondary schools in the London Borough of Merton
Educational institutions established in 1935
1935 establishments in England
People educated at Raynes Park County Grammar School
Community schools in the London Borough of Merton